Jarwar is a sub-tribe from the Gazini branch of Marri Baloch.

Marri-Bugti country

References

Baloch tribes
Social groups of Pakistan